The blackfin roughy (Hoplostethus melanopterus) is a slimehead of the order Beryciformes. It has a very wide distribution across the Atlantic, Pacific, and Indian Oceans. It can reach sizes of up to  TL.

References

External links
 

Hoplostethus
Fish described in 1938
Fish of the Atlantic Ocean
Fish of the Indian Ocean
Fish of the Pacific Ocean